A law enforcement agency (LEA) is any agency which enforces the law. This may be a special or local police/sheriffs, state highway patrol, and feds such as the Federal Bureau of Investigation (FBI) or the Drug Enforcement Administration (DEA).  Also, it can be used to describe an international organization such as Europol or Interpol.
This is a list of law enforcement agencies, organized by continent and then by country.

International
Ameripol, (Police Community of the Americans or Ameripol)
ASEANAPOL, (Inter-Asean Police)
EUROGENDFOR (European Gendarmerie Force)
European Union Police Mission in Bosnia and Herzegovina
European Union Rule of Law Mission in Kosovo
Europol (European Police Office)
Interpol (International Criminal Police Organization)
Law Enforcement Intelligence Unit
United Nations Interim Administration Mission in Kosovo
GCCPOL, ( Gulf Cooperation Council Police)
SELEC ( Southeast European Law enforcement Center), for the region of Balkan Countries, Police and customs regional international cooperation and joint activities.

Africa

Algeria

Gendarmerie Nationale
Algerian police

Angola

The National Police Force ( Angola )

Benin

Gendarmerie Nationale
Republican Police of Benin

Botswana

Botswana Police Service

Burkina Faso

Gendarmerie Nationale

Burundi

Nationale Police of Burundi

Cameroon

Cameroonian Police

Cape Verde

Polícia Judiciária
Polícia Nacional

Central African Republic

Chad

National Police of Chad
Gendarmerie Nationale

Comoros

Democratic Republic of the Congo

 Police nationale congolaise
Détection Militaire des Activités Anti-Patrie
Agence nationale de renseignements

Republic of the Congo

Côte d'Ivoire

Djibouti

Gendarmerie Nationale

Egypt

Egyptian National Police

Equatorial Guinea

Eritrea

 Eritrea Police Force

Ethiopia

 Ethiopian Federal Police

Gabon

Gendarmerie Nationale
National Police Force of Gabon

Gambia

Gambia Police Force

Ghana

Ghana Police Service

Guinea

Guinea-Bissau

 Judicial Police 
 National Republic Guards (Gendarmerie or Police)

Kenya

National Police Service
Kenya Police Service
Administration Police Service
Directorate of Criminal Investigations

Lesotho

Lesotho Mounted Police Service

Liberia

Liberian National Police

Libya

Libyan National Police

Madagascar

Gendarmerie Nationale
Presidential Security Regiment
Police Publique

Malawi
 
 Malawi Police Service

Mali

Gendarmerie Nationale

Mauritania

Gendarmerie Nationale
Police Nationale

Mauritius

Mauritius Police Force

Morocco

Gendarmerie Royale du Maroc (paramilitary national police force)
Sûreté Nationale du Maroc (civilian national police force)
 Moroccan Auxiliary Forces

Mozambique

 Mozambique Republic Police

Namibia
 Nationwide
Namibian Police Force
Special Reserve Force
Special Field Force
Municipalities
City Police (in some municipalities)

Niger

National Police
Gendarmerie Nationale

Nigeria

Nigeria Police Force
Nigeria Security and Civil Defence Corps
Economic and Financial Crimes Commission
National Drug Law Enforcement Agency

Rwanda

 Rwanda National Police

Sahrawi Arab Democratic Republic

São Tomé and Príncipe

Senegal

Gendarmerie Nationale
Red Guard

Seychelles

Seychelles Police Force

Sierra Leone

Sierra Leone Police

Somalia

Somali Police Force

South Africa

South African Police Service (SAPS)
Provincial Highway Patrol 
Municipal Police

South Sudan

 South Sudan Police Service

Sudan

Sudanese Police Service

Eswatini

Royal Eswatini Police Service

Tanzania

Tanzania Police Force
Prevention and Combating of Corruption Bureau
local police (mgambo and sungusungu)
 special jurisdiction police
Tanzania Intelligence and Security Service

Togo

Gendarmerie Nationale

Tunisia
Ministry of Interior
Direction Générale de la Sûreté Nationale (Police)
Direction Générale de la Garde Nationale (National Guard) 
Office National de la Protection Civile (Firefighter) 
Ministry of Finance
Direction Générale des Douanes (Customs) 
Ministry of Justice
Direction Générale des Prisons et de la Rééducation (Prisons Guards) 
Presidency
Direction Générale de la Sécurité du Chef de l'Etat et des Personnalités Officielles (Presidential Guards)

Uganda

Uganda National Police
Internal Security Organisation

Zambia

Zambia Police Service
Zambia Correctional Service

Zimbabwe

Zimbabwe Republic Police

Asia

Afghanistan
Afghan National Police

Bahrain
Royal Bahrain Police
National Security Agency (Bahrain)
Special Security Force Command

Bangladesh
Bangladesh Police
Border Guard Bangladesh
Bangladesh Coast Guard
Bangladesh Ansar
Bangladesh Customs
Department of Narcotics Control
Department of Immigration & Passport
Department of Prison
Department of Forest 
Telecommunication and Information Management
Police Internal Oversight
VAT Intelligence
Financial Intelligence Unit
Customs Intelligence and Investigation Directorate
Village Defence Party
Town Defence Party
Railway Nirapotta Bahini
AVSEC-Civil Aviation Authority of Bangladesh
Anti Corruption Commission
Chittagong Port Marine Department
Mongla Port Marine Department

Bhutan
Royal Bhutan Police

Brunei
Royal Brunei Police Force

Cambodia
Cambodian National Police

People's Republic of China

Mainland China 
 Ministry of Public Security
 State Immigration Administration
 Ministry of State Security
 People's Armed Police
 China Coast Guard
 Special Police Unit
 Beijing SWAT
 China Maritime Safety Administration
 General Administration of Customs
 Urban Management (Chengguan)

Hong Kong 
Hong Kong Police Force
Independent Commission Against Corruption
Hong Kong Correctional Services Department
Immigration Department
Customs and Excise Department

Macau 
Public Security Police Force of Macau

Republic of China (Taiwan) 
 National Police Agency
 National Immigration Agency
 Bureau of Investigation
 Coast Guard Administration
 Military Police Command

India
 Indian Police Service

Central (federal) law enforcement agencies 
Assam Rifles
Border Security Force
Central Bureau of Investigation
Central Board of Direct Taxes
Central Industrial Security Force
Central Reserve Police Force
Defence Security Corps
Indo-Tibetan Border Police
National Security Guard
National Investigation Agency
Railway Protection Force
Rashtriya Rifles
Sashastra Seema Bal
Special Frontier Force

State law enforcement agencies
Andhra Pradesh Police	
Arunachal Pradesh Police	
Bihar Police	
Chhattisgarh Police
Delhi Police	
Goa Police	
Gujarat Police	
Haryana Police
Himachal Pradesh Police	
Jammu and Kashmir Police	
Jharkhand Police	
Karnataka Police	
Kerala Police
Madhya Pradesh Police	
Maharashtra Police
Mumbai Police	
Manipur Police	
Meghalaya Police	
Mizoram Police
Nagaland Police
Odisha Police
Punjab Police
Rajasthan Police	
Sikkim Police
Tamil Nadu Police
Telangana Police
Tripura Police	
Uttarakhand Police
Uttar Pradesh Police
West Bengal Police

Indonesia

Iran
Islamic Revolutionary Guard Corps
Iran Police Force
Ministry of Intelligence

Iraq
Iraqi National Police Force (paramilitary)
Iraqi Police Service (civilian)

Israel

Israel Police
Israel Border Police
Military Police Corps

Japan

National Public Safety Commission
National Police Agency
Imperial Guard of Japan
Tokyo Metropolitan Police Department
 46 prefecture police departments
Japan Coast Guard (known as the Japanese Maritime Safety Agency from 1949 to 2000)
Ministry of Finance
Japan Customs
Ministry of Justice
Correctional Bureau
Immigration Services Agency

Jordan
Law enforcement in Jordan

Democratic People's Republic of Korea (North Korea)
Law enforcement in North Korea

Republic of Korea (South Korea)
Republic of Korea National Public Safety Commission
Republic of Korea National Police Agency
Seoul Metropolitan Police Agency
 13 local police agencies
Korea Correctional Service
Korea Customs Service
Korea Coast Guard (formerly known as the Republic of Korea Maritime Police)
Korea Immigration Service
Corruption Investigation Office for High-ranking Officials
Jeju Municipal Police
Korea Railway Police

Kuwait
Kuwait Police

Kyrgyzstan
Law enforcement in Kyrgyzstan
 Ministry of the Interior Kyrgyzstan National Police

Laos
Ministry of Security

Lebanon
Internal Security Forces

Malaysia

 Malaysian Ministry of Home Affairs
 Royal Malaysia Police
 National Anti-Drug Agency
 Malaysian Prison Department
 RELA Corps
 Immigration Department of Malaysia

Malaysian Ministry of Finance
 Royal Malaysian Custom

Prime Minister's Department (Malaysia)
 Malaysian Maritime Enforcement Agency
 Malaysian Anti-Corruption Commission

 Military of Malaysia
 Kor Polis Tentera DiRaja (Royal Military Police Corps)

Maldives
Maldives Police Force
Maldives National Defence Force
Maldivian Coast Guard

Mongolia
Law enforcement in Mongolia

Myanmar
Myanmar Police Force

Nepal
Nepalese Police Force
Nepalese Armed Police Force

Oman
Royal Oman Police

Pakistan

Federal
Anti-Narcotics Force
Airports Security Force
Federal Investigation Agency
Frontier Constabulary
National Accountability Bureau
National Highways & Motorway Police
Pakistan Customs
Pakistan Railways Police
Capital Territory Police

Provincial
Azad Jammu and Kashmir Police
Balochistan Police
Khyber Pakhtunkhwa Police
Gilgit-Baltistan Police
Punjab Police
Sindh Police

Joint Army & Federal
Pakistan Rangers (Sindh and Punjab)
Frontier Corps Balochistan (North)
Frontier Corps Balochistan (South)
Frontier Corps Khyber Pakhtunkhwa (North)
Frontier Corps Khyber Pakhtunkhwa (South)
Gilgit Baltistan Scouts (Gilgit-Baltistan)
Pakistan Maritime Security Agency
Pakistan Coast Guards

Philippines

Office of the President
Presidential Security Group (PSG)
Special Reaction Unit (SRU)
 Dangerous Drugs Board (DDB)
Philippine Drug Enforcement Agency (PDEA)
Optical Media Board (OMB) Enforcement and Investigation Division (EID)
Metropolitan Manila Development Authority – Traffic Enforcement Division (MMDA-TED)
Movie and Television Review and Classification Board (MTRCB)
Bases Conversion Development Authority
Clark Development Corporation - Public Safety Division (CDC-PSD)
Subic Bay Metropolitan Authority - Law Enforcement Department (SBMA-LED)
Department of the Interior and Local Government
National Police Commission (NAPOLCOM)
Philippine National Police (PNP)
Bureau of Jail Management and Penology (BJMP)
Bureau of Fire Protection  (BFP)
 Local Government Unit
 Public Order and Safety Office (POSO)
 Traffic Management Office (TMO)
Barangay Public Safety Office (BPSO)
Department of Justice
National Bureau of Investigation (NBI)
Bureau of Immigration—Law Enforcement Division  (BI-LED)
 Bureau of Corrections (BuCor)
Department of Transportation
Philippine Ports Authority – Port Police Department (PPA-PPD)
Land Transportation Office – Law Enforcement Service (LTO-LES)
Land Transportation Franchising and Regulatory Board (LTFRB)
Office for Transportation Security (OTS)
Manila International Airport Authority - Airport Police Department (MIAA-APD)
Philippine Coast Guard (PCG)
Maritime Industry Authority (MARINA)
Civil Aviation Authority of the Philippines (CAAP)
Department of Finance
Bureau of Internal Revenue (BIR)
Collection Enforcement Division (CED)
Enforcement Service (ES)
Large Taxpayers Collection and Enforcement Division (LTCED)
Bureau of Customs—Enforcement Group  (BOC-EG)
Bangko Sentral ng Pilipinas - Security Force (BSP-SF)
Department of Health
Food and Drug Administration (FDA)
 Office of Regulatory Enforcement Unit (OREU)
Department of Trade and Industry
Consumer Welfare and Trade Regulation Group  (DTI-CWTRG)
Department of Environment and National Resources
Law Enforcement and Licenses Division (DENR-LELD)
Department of National Defense
Armed Forces of the Philippines (AFP)
 Military Police (MP)
 Department of Agriculture
 Bureau of Fisheries and Aquatic Resources (BFAR)
 Bantay Dagat (Sea Patrol)

Qatar
Law enforcement in Qatar

Saudi Arabia
Royal Saudi Arabian Police Force
Saudi Arabian Traffic Police Force
Saudi Arabian Border Guard
Saudi Arabian Coast Guard
Saudi Arabian Customs and Immigration Department
Mabahith (Secret Service)
Hay'ah (Religious Police)

Singapore
Singapore Police Force
Special Operations Command
Crisis Negotiation Unit
Police K-9 Unit
Police National Service Full-time Light Strike Force
Police Tactical Unit (PTUs)
Special Tactics and Rescue
Police Coast Guard
Volunteer Special Constabulary
Auxiliary Police Forces
Aetos Security Management
Certis CISCO Security Private Limited
SATS Security Services
Corrupt Practices Investigation Bureau
Immigration and Checkpoints Authority
Central Narcotics Bureau
Internal Security Department
Singapore Armed Forces Military Police Command

Sri Lanka
Sri Lanka Police
Special Task Force
Criminal Investigation Department
Sri Lanka Corps of Military Police
Naval Provost Branch
Air Force Police
Commission to Investigate Allegation of Bribery or Corruption (Bribery Commission)

Syria
Law enforcement in Syria

Tajikistan
Law enforcement in Tajikistan

Thailand
Royal Thai Police
Department of Special Investigation
Special Branch Bureau is the Special Branch of the Royal Thai Police
Narcotics Control Board

East Timor
East Timor National Police

Turkmenistan
Law enforcement in Turkmenistan

United Arab Emirates

Emirati level
Abu Dhabi Police
Dubai Police Force
Sharjah Police Force

Uzbekistan
Law enforcement in Uzbekistan

Vietnam

National
 Vietnam People's Public Security (Công an Nhân dân Việt Nam) under the Ministry of Public Security (Bộ Công an Việt Nam), divides into:
 Vietnam People's Police (Cảnh sát Nhân dân Việt Nam) consists of:
 Traffic Police (Cảnh sát Giao thông), for traffic control and enforcement
 Judiciary Police (Cảnh sát Bảo vệ và Hỗ trợ Tư pháp), for judiciary and executive enforcement
 Rapid Response Police - also known as 113 Police (Cảnh sát Phản ứng Nhanh/Cảnh sát 113), for rapid criminal countering
 Criminal Investigation Police (Cảnh sát Hình sự), for criminal investigation
 Drug Investigation Police (Cảnh sát Điều tra Ma túy), for drug countering and investigation
 Corruption Investigation Police (Cảnh sát Điều tra Tham nhũng), for corruption investigation
 High Tech Investigation Police (Cảnh sát Điều tra Công nghệ cao), for high tech criminal investigation
 Administrative Police (Cảnh sát Quản lý Hành chính), for administrative and resident services
 Environmental Police (Cảnh sát Môi trường), for environmental law enforcement
 Fire and Rescue Police (Cảnh sát Phòng cháy Chữa cháy và Cứu nạn Cứu hộ), for firefighting, search and rescue missions
 Prison Guard (Cảnh sát Trại giam), for prison management and control
 Mobile Police (Cảnh sát Cơ động), for riot and terrorist countering
 Protective Guard (Cảnh vệ), for protective services of the State and Communist Party leaders
 Order Police (Cảnh sát Trật tự), for public order response
 Protective Police (Cảnh sát Bảo vệ Mục tiêu), for protective services of properties and personnel 
 Vietnam People's Security (An ninh Nhân dân Việt Nam) consists of:
 Cyber Security (An ninh Mạng), for cyber and internet affairs
 Immigration Security (An ninh Xuất nhập cảnh), for immigration management, airport and seaport entry
 Intelligence Service (Tình báo), for intelligence collection and investigation
 Ciphering Service (Cơ yếu), for protection of top secret documents
 Border Checkpoint Security (An ninh Cửa khẩu), for border checkpoint entry 
 Social Security (An ninh Xã hội), for social issues 
 Secret Service (Ngoại tuyến), for intelligence collection in secrecy
 Political Security (An ninh Chính trị), for political protection
 Financial and Monetary Security (An ninh Tài chính và Tiền tệ), for financial investigation
 Economical Security (An ninh Kinh tế), for economical investigation
 Agricultural and Rural Security (An ninh Nông nghiệp Nông thôn), for rural issues
 Information and Communication Security (An ninh Thông tin và Truyền thông), for information, press and media investigation
 Vietnam Customs under the Ministry of Finance
 Vietnam Border Guard and Vietnam Coast Guard under the Ministry of Defence
 Vietnam Forest Ranger and Vietnam Fishery Surveillance under the Ministry of Agriculture and Rural Development
Local
 Provincial/Municipal Public Security (Công an Tỉnh/Thành phố Trực thuộc Trung ương)
 District/Town/Provincial City Public Security (Công an Quận/Huyện/Thị xã/Thành phố Trực thuộc Tỉnh)
 Commune/Ward/Township Public Security (Công an Xã/Phường/Thị trấn)

Yemen
Law enforcement in Yemen

Europe

Albania
Law Enforcement in Albania

Andorra
Andorran Police Service and traffic police (local police) divided by communes

Armenia
Armenian National Police Service

Austria

Federal
Bundesamt zur Korruptionsprävention und Korruptionsbekämpfung (BAK): Federal Bureau to prevent and to fight corruption
  

Bundeskriminalamt (BK): Federal Criminal Police Office
Bundespolizei: Federal Police Service
Alpine Einsatzgruppen (AEG): Mountain Police, part of Federal Police
Bereitschaftseinheit Wien (BE): Standby Police Unit for Vienna
Einsatzeinheit (EE): Riot Police of Federal Police
See- und Strompolizei: River branch of Federal Police
Sonderdienste Sektor Graz (SEKTOR): SWAT unit of Federal Police in Graz
WEGA (only short version in use, originally from Wiener Einsatz-Gruppe Alarmabteilung): SWAT unit of Federal Police in Vienna
Einsatzkommando Cobra (EKO Cobra): Federal SWAT and special forces unit, which is not part of the Federal Police, part of the Ministry of the Interior (BMI)
Finanzpolizei: Financial Guard
Flugpolizei: Air Police, which is not part of the Federal Police, part of the Ministry of the Interior (BMI)
Justizwache (JW): Penitentiary Police
Justizwache Einsatzgruppe (JEG): SWAT Team of Penitentiary Police
Militärpolizei: Military Police of the Austrian Armed Forces
Operative Zollaufsicht (OZA): Customs Service
Sondereinheit für Observation (SEO): Special Unit for Covered Technical Surveillance, which is not part of the Federal Police, part of the Ministry of the Interior (BMI)
Municipalities
Stadtpolizei: Local or City Police
Ordnungswache or Ordnungsamt: municipal law enforcement, in unincorporated cities, that are not allowed to have a Stadtpolizei, like Graz and Klagenfurt
Straßenaufsicht: municipal traffic enforcement

Azerbaijan
Azerbaijani National Police

Bailiwick of Guernsey
States of Guernsey Police Service
Guernsey Border Agency

Bailiwick of Jersey
States of Jersey Police
States of Jersey Customs and Immigration Service

Belarus
Belarusian Militsiya (National Police)
Belarusian Presidential Guard
Belarusian State Security Agency

Belgium
Federal level
Federal police (1 federal force for the entire country, responsible for specialized and supra-local policing as well as support to the local police)

Local level
Local police (189 local forces for 189 police zones that encompass either one muninicipality or multiple municipalities, responsible for basic policing)

Bosnia and Herzegovina
Bosnia and Herzegovina Federal Police

Bulgaria

National Investigative Service, legally part of the judiciary and under the Ministry of Justice
State Agency for National Security
General Directorate of the Police
Specialized Police Forces
General Directorate of the Border Police

Croatia
Croatian Police

Cyprus
Cyprus Police Force

Czech Republic

National
Czech Republic National Police
The Customs Administration of the Czech Republic
General Inspection of Security Forces
Prison Service of the Czech Republic (Mainly within buildings under its authority)
Municipal
Městská policie (Municipal police)

Denmark
Danish National Police
Rigspolitiet
Danish Security and Intelligence Service

Estonia
Estonian Police

Finland
Police of Finland
 Finnish Border Guard
 Finnish Customs
 Finnish Security Intelligence Service
 National Bureau of Investigation

France

National
Administration pénitentiaire (Department of Corrections)
Équipe régionale d’intervention et de sécurité (SWAT teams)
Douane (Customs)

Gendarmerie Nationale
Garde républicaine (Republican Guard): Guard of honour
Republican Guard Cavalry Regiment
Republican Guard Infantry Regiment
Gendarmerie de l'Air (air police)
Gendarmerie Maritime (maritime police)
Gendarmerie Départementale
Gendarmerie Mobile
Groupe d'intervention de la gendarmerie nationale (GIGN)
Police Nationale
Compagnies Républicaines de Sécurité (riot control force)
Prefecture of Police Paris Police Service

Municipal
Garde champêtre (Park Rangers/Game Wardens)
Police Municipale (Local Police)

Overseas France
Royal police and territorial guard (Wallis and Futuna)

Georgia
Law enforcement in Georgia

Germany

Federal
Bundeskriminalamt (BKA): Federal Criminal Office
MEK (Mobiles Einsatzkommando): Special Unit for Surveillance and Detention
Bundespolizei (BPOL): Federal police
Bereitschaftspolizei (BePo): Riot Police Branch of Federal police
Beweissicherungs- und Festnahmeeinheit plus (BFE+): Federal Police anti-terror unit for long-lasting operations
Beweissicherungs- und Festnahmeeinheit (BFE): Federal Police Special Detention Unit
Bundespolizei-Fliegerstaffel (BPOLFLG): Federal Police Air Group
Grenzschutzgruppe 9 der Bundespolizei (GSG 9): Federal Police Special Forces Group
Mobile Fahndungseinheit (MFE): Special Unit for Covered (Individual and Technical) Surveillance
Polizeiliche Schutzaufgaben Ausland (PSA BPOL): Protection force for the security of German diplomatic missions
Bundeszollverwaltung: Federal Customs Service
Zollkriminalamt (ZKA): Customs Investigation Bureau
Zentrale Unterstützungsgruppe Zoll (ZUZ): Customs SWAT Unit
Feldjägertruppe: Military Police of the Federal Defense Force
Küstenwache: Coast Guard, it is not separate agency, it consists of units compiled of ships and personnel of the Federal Police, Customs Service, the Wasser und Schifffahrtsverwaltung des Bundes (WSV) (Federal Waterways and Shipping Administration) and the Bundesanstalt für Landwirtschaft und Ernährung (BLE) (Federal Agency for Agriculture and Nutrition)
Polizei beim Deutschen Bundestag (Polizei DBT): Federal Parliament Police

State
Landespolizei: State Police
Schutzpolizei (SchuPo): Uniformed branch of state police
Landeskriminalamt (LKA): State criminal office / state investigative service
Mobiles Einsatzkommando (MEK): Special Unit for Surveillance and Detention
Kriminalpolizei (Kripo): Detective branch of state police
Bereitschaftspolizei (BePo): Riot police branch of state police
Beweissicherungs- und Festnahmeeinheit (BFE): State Police Special Detention Unit
Spezialeinsatzkommando (SEK): SWAT unit of State Police
Autobahnpolizei: Highway patrol of state police
Wasserschutzpolizei (WSP): River branch of state police
Wachpolizei (WaPol): Branch of state police for the security of state government buildings or diplomatic facilities, only in the states of Berlin and Hesse
Freiwilliger Polizeidienst: Auxiliary police force, only in the states of Baden-Württemberg and Hesse
Sicherheitspartner: Auxiliary police force, only in the state of Brandenburg
Sicherheitswacht: Auxiliary police force, only in the states of Bavaria and Saxony
Justiz: Penitentiary police

in Bavaria solely
Bayerische Grenzpolizei (GrePo): Border police of the state of Bavaria from 1946 until 1998 and re-established in 2018
Unterstützungskommando (USK): State police support commando, similar tasks like the BFE of other states

Municipalities
Kommunaler Ordnungsdienst (KOD): Municipal law enforcement, different regulations by state and local laws
Kommunalpolizei or Stadtpolizei: Municipal police in cities of the state of Hesse
Gemeindevollzugsdienst (GVD): Municipal police in the state of Baden-Württemberg
Ordnungsamt (OA): Municipal police or municipal law enforcement, different regulations by state and local laws
Polizeibehörde: municipal law enforcement, different regulations by state and local laws
Stadtwacht: municipal law enforcement in the state of North Rhine-Westphalia (NRW)

Greece
Hellenic Police Service – created in 1984 from the below agencies:
Hellenic Gendarmerie (1833–1984)
Cities Police (1920– 1984)
Hellenic Coast Guard
Municipal Police

Hungary
Hungarian National Police
Hungarian Border Guard
Hungarian Customs and Excise Authority

Iceland

Directorate of Customs
National Police of Iceland
Icelandic Prison Service

Ireland

Garda Síochána
Criminal Assets Bureau (joint unit between the Garda and Irish Sheriff Service)
Civic Guard (disbanded and merged into the Garda Síochána in 1923)
Dublin Metropolitan Police (disbanded and merged into the Garda Síochána in 1925)
Garda Síochána Reserve (Reserve police force that works with and assists regular Police)
Irish Revenue
Irish Customs Service
Irish Sheriff Service
Irish Prison Service
Irish Naturalisation and Immigration Service
Border Management Unit
Airport Police (Ireland) Irish Aviation Police Service in Irish state owned airports
Irish Military Police (Corps of the Irish Defence Forces which enforce military law)

Isle of Man
Isle of Man Constabulary
Isle of Man Airport Police

Italy

National
Carabinieri (Paramilitary Police – military corps)
Corazzieri (Cuirassiers): Guard of honour
Gruppo di intervento speciale (Special Intervention Group)
Raggruppamento Operativo Speciale (Special Operations Group)

Guardia di Finanza (Border Police, Financial and Customs Police, is also a military corps)
Antiterrorismo Pronto Impiego (Anti-Terrorism)
Gruppo di investigazione criminalità organizzata (Organized Crime Investigation Group)
Gruppo Operativo Antidroga (Counter-narcotics Group)
Gruppo Anticrimine Tecnologico (Counter-cybercrime Group)
Comando Operativo Aeronavale (Air-Naval Operational Command)
Servizio Cinofili (Police Dog Division K9)

Polizia di Stato (State Police)
Nucleo Operativo Centrale di Sicurezza (Central Security Operations Service)
Polizia Stradale (Traffic Police)
Polizia Ferroviaria (Railroad Police)
Polizia Penitenziaria (Penitentiary Police), part of the Ministry of Justice (Ministero della Giustizia)

Provincial
Polizia Provinciale (Provincial Police) that mainly enforce hunting and fishing laws, it consists of several organizations (not a LEA by itself)
Municipal
Polizia Municipale (Municipal Police; originally called the Vigiles or Vigili Urbani), it consists of several organizations (not a LEA by itself)

Kazakhstan
 
(National Police • Kazak Militsiya • Полиция Казахстана)

Latvia
Latvian State Police
Latvian State Security Police
Latvian State Border Guard

Lichtenstein
Liechtenstein Police

Lithuania
Lithuanian National Police
Special Investigation Service
Lithuanian State Border Guard Service
Lithuanian Military Police
Financial Crime Investigation Service

Luxembourg
Grand Ducal Police

Malta
Malta Police Force

Moldova
Moldovan Ministry of the Interior
Moldovan National Police

Monaco
Sûreté Publique de Monaco (Police)
Compagnie des Carabiniers du Prince de Monaco (Prince's Guard)

Montenegro
Montenegro Civil Police

The Netherlands
Royal Marechaussee (military police/gendarmerie)
National police corps
Fiscal Information and Investigation Service

North Macedonia
Macedonian Police Service

Norway
Norwegian Police Service

Poland
Policja (Police)
Żandarmeria Wojskowa (Military Gendarmerie)
Straż Graniczna  (Border Guard)
Agencja Bezpieczeństwa Wewnętrznego - (Internal Security Agency)
Centralne Biuro Antykorupcyjne - (Central Anticorruption Bureau)
Służba Celno-Skarbowa (Customs and Revenue Service)
Straż Miejska (City Guard)

Portugal
Civilian
Ministério da Administração Interna
Guarda Nacional Republicana (gendarmerie)
Polícia de Segurança Pública (civilian police)
Grupo de Operações Especiais
Polícia Judiciária (investigation police)
Serviço de Estrangeiros e Fronteiras (equivalent to US ICE)
Autoridade Segurança Alimentar e Economica ASAE (a mix equivalent to US FDA and an Economic crime police)
Military
Ministério da Defesa Nacional
Polícia do Exército (Portuguese Army military police)
Unidade de Polícia Naval (Portuguese Navy military police, part of the Portuguese Marine Corps)
Polícia Aérea (Portuguese Air Force military police)
Polícia Marítima (maritime police, part of the Portuguese Navy)

Romania
Poliția Română (Romanian Police, national police force)
Poliția de Frontieră (Border Police)
Jandarmeria Română (Romanian Gendarmerie, has military status)
Poliția Locală (Local Police)
Direcția Generală Anticorupție (Internal Affairs)
Direcția Națională Anticorupție (anti-corruption agency)
Financial Guard

Russia

Ministry of Internal Affairs
Police of Russia
Militsiya (Russia)
Rosgvardia (National Guard of Russia)
Federal Protective Service – protection of high rank officials
 Presidential Security Service – concerned with the tasks related to the protection of the President of Russia.
Federal Security Service – Federal anti-terror and counter-espionnage Service
 The Federal Border Guard Service is subordinate to the FSB and responsible for Maritime surveillance.
 The Ministry of Russia for Civil Defense, Emergencies and Elimination of Consequences of Natural Disasters ("EMERCOM") is responsible for the civil defence regulation, protection from fire and has own troops.
 The Ministry of Justice of Russia
 Federal service of Punishment Execution (FSIN) is responsible for the penal correction and prison system.
 The Ministry of Defence of Russia
 Russian Military Police (under construction)
Investigative Committee of Russia – Investigative body, struggling the Corruption and High Criminal Affairs ("The Russian FBI"). Created on 15 January 2011.

San Marino
Gendarmeria (paramilitary police)
Polizia Civile (civilian police)
Guardia di Rocca (border patrol and permanent military force)

Serbia
Bezbednosno Informativna Agencija (BIA)
Serbian Ministry of the Interior (MUP)
Gendarmery (Serbia)

Slovakia

National
Slovak Police Force
Municipal
mestská polícia (Municipal police)

Slovenia
Slovenian National Police
Specialna Enota Policije

Spain
National
Guardia Civil
Cuerpo Nacional de Policía (National Police Corps)
Dirección de Instituciones Penitenciarias (Directorate of Penitentiary Institutions)
Servicio de Vigilancia Aduanera (Customs Surveillance Service)

Autonomous communities
Ertzaintza in the Basque Country
Mossos d'Esquadra in Catalonia
Policía Foral in Navarre

Municipal
Policía Municipal (also known as Policía Local or Guardia Urbana) in every town and city.
Autoridad Portuaria (Port Police)

Sweden
Ministry of Justice
Polismyndigheten
Säkerhetspolisen
Ekobrottsmyndigheten
Kustbevakningen
Kriminalvården
Ministry of Finance
Tullverket
Ministry of Defence
Militärpolisen

Switzerland

Border Guard Corps
Federal Office of Police
Cybercrime Coordination Unit Switzerland (CYCO) ,
Cantonal police
Municipal police

Turkey
General Directorate of Security
Gendarmerie General Command(Turkey)
Military Police (Turkey)
National Intelligence Organization
Coast Guard Command
Municipal Police
General Directorate of Customs Protection
General Directorate of Forest Protection
General Directorate of Prisons and Detention Houses
National Parks Game Enforcement

Ukraine
MVS
National Police of Ukraine
National Guard of Ukraine
State Border Guard Service of Ukraine
General Prosecutor of Ukraine

United Kingdom

Territorial police forces

Avon and Somerset Constabulary
Bedfordshire Police
Cambridgeshire Constabulary
Cheshire Constabulary
City of London Police
Cleveland Police
Cumbria Constabulary
Derbyshire Constabulary
Devon and Cornwall Police
Dorset Police
Durham Constabulary
Dyfed-Powys Police (Heddlu Dyfed Powys)
Essex Police
Gloucestershire Constabulary
Greater Manchester Police
Gwent Police (Heddlu Gwent)
Hampshire Constabulary
Hertfordshire Constabulary
Humberside Police
Kent Police
Lancashire Constabulary
Leicestershire Police
Lincolnshire Police
Merseyside Police
Metropolitan Police (London, excluding the City of London)
Norfolk Constabulary
Northamptonshire Police
North Wales Police (Heddlu Gogledd Cymru)
Northumbria Police
North Yorkshire Police
Nottinghamshire Police
Police Scotland
Police Service of Northern Ireland
South Wales Police (Heddlu De Cymru)
South Yorkshire Police
Staffordshire Police
Suffolk Constabulary
Surrey Police
Sussex Police
Thames Valley Police
Warwickshire Police
West Mercia Police
West Midlands Police
West Yorkshire Police
Wiltshire Police

National police forces
National Crime Agency
Ministry of Defence Police
National Wildlife Crime Unit
National Domestic Extremism and Disorder Intelligence Unit
National Counter Terrorism Security Office
Protection Command
National Fraud Intelligence Bureau
National Vehicle Crime Intelligence Service
British Transport Police (Great Britain)
Civil Nuclear Constabulary (Great Britain)
National Ballistics Intelligence Service (Great Britain)
National Police Air Service (England and Wales)

National non-police law enforcement forces
Office for Security and Counter-Terrorism
Security Service
Border Force
Immigration Enforcement
His Majesty's Revenue and Customs
Driver and Vehicle Standards Agency (Great Britain)
Driver and Vehicle Agency (Northern Ireland)
Serious Fraud Office (England, Wales and Northern Ireland)
Independent Police Complaints Commission (England and Wales)

Service police forces
Royal Navy Police
Royal Military Police
Royal Air Force Police

British Overseas Territories police forces
Bermuda Police Service
British Indian Ocean Territory Police
Pitcairn Islands Police
Royal Cayman Islands Police Service
Royal Falkland Islands Police
Royal Montserrat Police Service
Royal Virgin Islands Police Force
Saint Helena Police Service
Royal Gibraltar Police

MOD overseas police forces
Sovereign Base Areas Police
Gibraltar Defence Police

Overseas service police forces
British Indian Ocean Territory Joint Service Police Unit
Cyprus Joint Police Unit
Falkland Islands Joint Service Police Security Unit
Gibraltar Joint Provost and Security Unit

Vatican
Corpo della Gendarmeria (known as the Corpo di Vigilanza until 2002)
Swiss Guard

North America

Antigua and Barbuda
Royal Police Force of Antigua and Barbuda
Antigua and Barbuda Defence Force
Antigua and Barbuda Regiment
Antigua and Barbuda Coast Guard

Bahamas
Royal Bahamas Defence Force
Royal Bahamas Police Force
Bahamas Department of Correctional Services
Bahamas Customs Service
Bahamas Immigration Service

Barbados
Barbados Defence Force
Barbados Regiment
Barbados Coast Guard
Barbados Police Service

Belize
Belize Defence Force
Ground Forces
Air Wing
Maritime Wing
Volunteer Guard
Royal Belize Police Force

Bermuda
Bermuda Police Service
Bermuda Reserve Police
Bermuda International Airport Security Police

Canada

Federal
Canada Border Services Agency
Canadian Forces Military Police
Royal Canadian Mounted Police
Canadian National Railway Police
Environment Canada Federal Game Officers
Parks Canada Park Wardens
Fisheries and Oceans Canada Fishery Enforcement Officers
Correctional Service of Canada
Canadian Pacific Railway Police
Transport Canada Enforcement
Ports Canada Police

Provincial
Ontario Provincial Police
Royal Newfoundland Constabulary
Sûreté du Québec
Alberta Sheriffs
British Columbia Sheriff Service
Ontario Correctional Services
Ontario Highway Carrier Safety and Enforcement

Municipal
Abbotsford Police Department
Barrie Police Service
Brandon Police Service
Brockville Police Service
Calgary Police Service
Camrose Police Service
Central Saanich Police Service
Charlottetown Police Service
Durham Regional Police Service
Edmonton Police Service
Fredericton Police Force
Gatineau Police
Halifax Regional Police
Halton Regional Police Service
Hamilton Police Service
Laval Police Service
Lethbridge Police Service
London Police Service
Medicine Hat Police Service
Montreal Police Service
Niagara Parks Police Service
Niagara Regional Police Service
Ottawa Police Service
Oak Bay Police Service
Peel Regional Police
Quebec City Police
Rivière-du-Nord Police
Regina Police Service
Saskatoon Police Service
South Coast British Columbia Transportation Authority Police Service
South Simcoe Police Service
St. Thomas Police Service
Toronto Police Service
Vancouver Police Department
Victoria Police Department
Waterloo Regional Police Service
West Grey Police
West Vancouver Police Department
Winnipeg Police Service
York Regional Police

Costa Rica
Public Force of Costa Rica

Cuba
Policía Nacional Revolucionaria

Dominica, Commonwealth of
Commonwealth of Dominica Police Force (CDPF)

Dominican Republic
Policia Nacional Dominicana
Dirección Nacional de Control de Drogas (DNCD)
Departamento Nacional de Investigaciones (DNI)

El Salvador
 Policía Nacional civil de El Salvador

Grenada
Royal Grenada Police Force

Guatemala
Guatemalan Policía Nacional

Haiti

Haitian National Police
Haitian Coast Guard Commission
United Nations Stabilisation Mission in Haiti
Army Force of Haiti (FAd'H)

Honduras
Honduran National Police

Jamaica
Jamaica Constabulary Force
Major Organised Crime and Anti-Corruption Agency (MOCA)
Financial Services Commission (FSC)
Municipal Police
Financial Investigations Division(FID)
Jamaica Customs Agency (JCA) 
Passport, Immigration and Citizenship Agency(PICA)

Mexico

 Law enforcement in Mexico

Federal
Federales (former federal law enforcement agencies of mexico):
Federal Police (Policía Federal), former Policía Federal Preventiva (Federal Preventive Police, 1999-2009), disbanded on 2019
3rd Military Police Brigade from the Mexican Army
Policía Federal de Caminos (Federal Highway Police, 1928-1999)
Guardia Nacional, since 2019, a gendarmerie that replaced the former civilian agency
Policía Federal Ministerial (Federal Ministerial Police; since 2019, Coordinación de Métodos de Investigación, Investigative Methods Coordination), federal investigative agency under the authority of Fiscalía General de la República (Attorney General of Mexico)

State and local
State police (Policía Estatal, its official name may vary from state to state), 32 independent agencies under each State's governor authority
State Ministerial Police (Policía Estatal Ministerial, its mame also may vary), under each State's Attorney authority
Local or Municipal Police (Policía municipal). Most of 2,454 Municipalities of Mexico have its own Police Departament under mayor's (presidente municipal) authority
Mexico City Police in both state and municipal duties throughout the 16 boroughs of Mexico City

Nicaragua
Nicaraguan Policía Nacional

Panama
Panamanian Public Forces
 National Border Service
 National Aeronaval Service
 Panamanian National Police
 Institutional Protection Service

Saint Kitts and Nevis
Royal Saint Kitts and Nevis Police Force
Saint Kitts and Nevis Defence Force

Saint Lucia
Royal Saint Lucia Police Force
Regional Security System

Saint Vincent and the Grenadines
Royal Saint Vincent and the Grenadines Police Force
Regional Security System

Trinidad and Tobago
Trinidad and Tobago Police Service

United States

Law enforcement in the United States

Federal

Federal law enforcement agencies in the United States (Feds)

United States Department of State (DOS)
Bureau of Diplomatic Security
Diplomatic Security Service (DSS)

United States Department of the Treasury
Internal Revenue Service, Criminal Investigation (IRS-CI)
Office of the Treasury Inspector General for Tax Administration (TIGTA)
Office of the Special Inspector General for the Troubled Asset Relief Program (SIGTARP)
Office of the Special Inspector General for Pandemic Recovery (SIGPR)
United States Mint Police (USMP)
Bureau of Engraving and Printing Police (BEP Police)

United States Department of Defense (DOD)
Defense Criminal Investigative Service (DCIS)
Pentagon Force Protection Agency
Defense Logistics Agency Police

Department of the Army
United States Army Criminal Investigation Division (Army CID)
United States Army Military Police Corps
United States Army Counterintelligence (ACI)
Department of the Army Civilian Police (DACP)
Department of the Army Civilian Security Guards (DASG)

Department of the Navy
Naval Criminal Investigative Service (NCIS)
Master-at-arms (United States Navy)
Office of Naval Intelligence Police (ONI Police)
Marine Corps Provost Marshal's Office
United States Marine Corps Criminal Investigation Division (USMC CID)
United States Marine Corps Civilian Police

Department of the Air and Space Force
United States Air Force Office of Special Investigations (Airforce OSI)
United States Air Force Security Forces
Department of the Air Force Police

National Security Agency
National Security Agency Police (NSA Police)

United States Department of Justice (DOJ)
Bureau of Alcohol, Tobacco, Firearms and Explosives (ATF)
Drug Enforcement Administration (DEA) (since 1973)
Bureau of Narcotics and Dangerous Drugs (1968–73)
Federal Bureau of Narcotics (1930–68)
Bureau of Prohibition (1927–33)
Bureau of Drug Abuse Control (1966–68)
Federal Bureau of Investigation (FBI)
Bureau of Investigation (BOI) (1908–35)
Federal Bureau of Prisons (BOP)
United States Marshals Service (USMS)

United States Department of the Interior (USDI)
Bureau of Indian Affairs Police
Bureau of Land Management Office of Law Enforcement & Security
National Park Service
National Park Service Rangers
United States Park Police
United States Fish and Wildlife Service Office of Law Enforcement

United States Department of Agriculture (USDA)
U.S. Forest Service Law Enforcement and Investigations
Office of Inspector General

United States Department of Commerce (DOC)
National Oceanic and Atmospheric Administration Fisheries Office of Law Enforcement

United States Department of Health and Human Services (HHS)
Food and Drug Administration (FDA)
Office of Criminal Investigations

United States Department of Education (ED)
Office of the Inspector General (OIG)

United States Department of Veterans Affairs (VA)
United States Department of Veterans Affairs Police

United States Department of Homeland Security (DHS)

Federal Protective Service (FPS)
U.S. Coast Guard (USCG)
United States Coast Guard Police (CGPD)
Coast Guard Investigative Service (CGIS)
U.S. Customs and Border Protection (CBP)
U.S. Border Patrol (USBP)
U.S. Immigration and Customs Enforcement (ICE)
U.S. Secret Service (USSS)
Transportation Security Administration (TSA)

United States Department of Transportation (DOT)
Federal Aviation Administration (FAA)

Other federal law enforcement agencies
Central Intelligence Agency Security Protective Service (CIA SPS)
Federal Reserve Police
Library of Congress Police (Dissolved 2009)
Smithsonian National Zoological Park Police
United States Capitol Police (USCP)
United States Postal Inspection Service (USPIS)
United States Postal Service Office of Inspector General (USPS OIG)
United States Probation Service (USPO)
United States Supreme Court Police

State, county and local

 State trooper (United States) (State Police or Highway Patrol)
 Sheriffs in the United States (County Police or Sheriff's Office)
 Constables in the United States (County Constable)
 Police in the United States (Local Police Department)
 Marshals in the United States (Local Marshal's Office)
 Special Weapons and Tactics (SWAT) or Special Response Team (SRT)

Territorial police

Commonwealth of Puerto Rico

Puerto Rico Department of Justice
Special Investigations Bureau
Puerto Rico Commonwealth Police (also known as the Policia de Puerto Rico or the Puerto Rico Police Department)
Puerto Rico Commonwealth Marshal's Office
Puerto Rico Department of Natural Resources Conservation Rangers
Puerto Rico Department of Parks and Recreation Park Rangers
Puerto Rico Ports Authority
Puerto Rico Port Authority Police Department (Policia de los Puertos)
Puerto Rico Department of Corrections and Rehabilitation

Territory of Guam
Guam Police Department
Supreme Court of Guam Deputy Marshals
Guam Superior Court Deputy Marshals
Guam Customs and Quarantine Agency
Port Authority of Guam
Guam Port Authority Police
Antonio B. Won Pat Guam International Airport Police Department
Guam Department of Agriculture Conservation Officers
Guam Department of Parks and Recreation Park Patrol Officers
Guam Department of Corrections

Commonwealth of the Northern Mariana Islands
Commonwealth of the Northern Mariana Islands Department of Public Safety
Police Division
Fire/Rescue Division
Commonwealth of the Northern Mariana Islands Department of Corrections
Commonwealth of the Northern Mariana Islands Department of Conservation Conservation Officers
Commonwealth of the Northern Mariana Islands Ports Authority Police Department

Territory of American Samoa
American Samoa Department of Public Safety
American Samoa Territorial Police
Pago Pago International Airport Police Department
American Samoa Ports Authority Police Department
American Samoa Community College Police Department

Territory of the United States Virgin Islands
United States Virgin Islands Police Department
United States Virgin Islands Territorial Marshal's Office

Railroad Police
Union Pacific Police Department
BNSF Police Department
CSX Police Department
Norfolk Southern Police Department
Amtrak Police Department (government-owned passenger train service)
Canadian National Railway Police
Canadian Northern Railway Police
Canadian Pacific Railway Police Service

Oceania

Australia

Federal
Australian Federal Police (AFP) (also ACT territory police)
Australian Crime Commission (ACC) (ex. National Crime Authority)
Australian Customs and Border Protection Service (ACS)
Australian Government Attorney General's Department
Australian Protective Service (APS) (diplomatic & Head of Govt. protection) - now part of the Australian Federal Police
Australian Quarantine and Inspection Service (AQIS)
Australian Securities and Investments Commission (ASIC)
Australian Security Intelligence Organisation (ASIO) (domestic intelligence)

Service Police
Royal Australian Corps of Military Police
Naval Police Coxswain
RAAF Security Police
Australian Defence Force Investigative Service

State
New South Wales Police Force
Northern Territory Police
Office of the Sheriff of New South Wales
Queensland Police Service
RailCorp Transit Officer
South Australia Police
Tasmania Police
Victoria Police
Western Australia Police
Crime and Corruption Commission, Western Australia
Crime and Misconduct Commission, Queensland
Independent Commission Against Corruption, New South Wales
New South Wales Crime Commission
New South Wales Police Integrity Commission
Office of Police Integrity, Victoria
Local Government Council Ranger

Fiji
Fiji Police

Kiribati
Kiribati Police Force

Marshall Islands
Marshall Islands National Police

Federated States of Micronesia
Federated States of Micronesia National Police

Nauru
Nauru Police Force

New Zealand
New Zealand Police
Armed Offenders Squad
Diplomatic Protection Service
Organised Crime Agency
Serious Fraud Office
Royal New Zealand Police College
Special Tactics Group
New Zealand Security Intelligence Service
Government Communications Security Bureau
New Zealand Customs Service
New Zealand Department of Corrections
Ministry of Agriculture and Forestry
Ministry of Fisheries
Immigration New Zealand
Military Police

Palau
Palau National Police

Papua New Guinea
Royal Papua New Guinea Constabulary

Pitcairn Islands
Law enforcement in the Pitcairn Islands

Samoa
Samoa Police Service

Solomon Islands
Royal Solomon Islands Police Force

Tonga
Royal Tongan Police Service

Tuvalu
Tuvalu Police Force

Vanuatu
Vanuatu Police Force

South America

Argentina

Federal
Gendarmería Nacional Argentina (GNA) (Argentine National Gendarmerie)
Prefectura Naval Argentina (PNA) (Argentine Naval Prefecture)
Policía de Seguridad Aeroportuaria (PSA) (Airport Security Police)
Policía Federal Argentina (PFA) (Argentine Federal Police)
Servicio Penitenciario Federal (SPF) (Federal Penitentiary Service)
Oficina Anticorrupción (OA) (Counter Corruption Bureau)
Secretaría de Inteligencia del Estado (Intelligent Agency)

Armed Forces of Argentina

Military Police 
Naval Infraestructure Police

Provincial
Each one of Argentina's twenty-three provinces has its own Provincial Police force.
 Buenos Aires Provincial Police (Policía Bonaerense)
 Santa Fe Provincial Police (Policía de la Provincia de Santa Fe)
 Córdoba Provincial Police (Policía de la Provincia de Córdoba)
 Tucumán Provincial Police (Policía de la Provincia de Tucumán)
 Chaco Provincial Police (Policia de la Provincia del Chaco)
 San Juan Provincial Police (Policia de la Provincia de San Juan)
 San Luis Provincial Police (Policia de la Provincia de San Luis)
 Formosa Provincial Police (Policia de la Provincia de Formosa)
 Neuquén Provincial Police (Policia de la Provincia de Neuquén)
 Chubut Provincial Police (Policia de la Provincia de Chubut)
 Santa Cruz Provincial Police (Policia de la Provincia de Santa Cruz)
 Tierra del Fuego Provincial Police (Policia de la Provincia de Tieraa del Fuego)
 Rio Negro Provincial Police (Policia de la Provincia de Río Negro)
 La Pampa Provincial Police (Policia de la Provincia de la Pampa)
 Catamarca Provincial Police (Policia de la Provincia de Catamarca)
 Santiago del Estero Provincial Police (Policia de la Provincia de Santiago del Estero)
 Salta Provincial Police (Policia de la Provincia de Salta)
 Jujuy Provincial Police (Policia de la Provincia de Jujuy)
 Misiones Provincial Police (Policia de la Provincia de Misiones)
 La Rioja Provincial Police (Policia de la Provincia de La Rioja)
 Entre Ríos Provincial Police (Policia de la Provincia de Entre Ríos)
 Corrientes Provincial Police (Policia de la Provincia de Corrientes)
 Mendoza Provincial Police (Policia de la Provincia de Mendoza)

Local
Buenos Aires Metropolitan Police
Buenos Aires City Police

Bolivia
Bolivian Policia Nacional

Brazil
Law enforcement in Brazil
Brazilian Federal Police
Brazilian Federal Highway Police
Brazilian Military Police
Brazilian police militias
Brazilian Civil Police
Brazilian Intelligence Agency
Municipal Guards

Chile
Carabineros de Chile
Policía de Investigaciones de Chile (PDI) 
Gendarmería de Chile

Colombia
Colombian National Police
Highway Police
Directorate of Criminal Investigation and Interpol (DIJIN)
Directorate of Carabineers and Rural Security
Fiscal and Customs Police
Mobile Anti-Disturbance Squadron
Mobile Carabinier Squadrons
Cuerpo Tecnico de Investigacion (CTI)
Migración Colombia

Ecuador
National Police of Ecuador

Guyana
Law enforcement in Guyana

Panama
Law enforcement in Panama

Paraguay
Law enforcement in Paraguay

Peru
Policia Nacional del Peru

Suriname
Law enforcement in Suriname

Uruguay
Law enforcement in Uruguay

Venezuela
Law enforcement in Venezuela
Bolivarian Intelligence Service
Policía Nacional Bolivariana

Disbanded agencies
Note: Many of these fall under the definition of secret police and derive from that list.

Austria
B-Gendarmerie (paramilitary security force from ca. 1950 until 1955)
Bundesgendarmerie (Federal Constabulary until 2005)

Costa Rica
Guardia Civil

Czechoslovakia
Veřejná bezpečnost (Public security)
StB (State Security)

Germany
Federal Republic of Germany
Bundesgrenzschutz (BGS) (Federal Border Guard until 2005)
Freiwillige Polizei-Reserve (FPR) (Voluntary paramilitary special police of the state of Berlin until 2002)

East Germany
Volkspolizei (VoPo) (People's Police)
Ministerium für Staatssicherheit (StaSi) (Ministry for State Security)

Nazi Germany
Ordnungspolizei (Orpo) (Order Police)
Kriminalpolizei (Kripo) (Criminal Police)
Sicherheitspolizei (SiPo) (Security Police)
Geheime Staatspolizei (Gestapo) (Secret State Police)
Zollgrenzschutz (ZGS) (Customs Border Protection)
Feldgendarmerie (Field Military Police)
Feldjägerkorps (Field Police Corps)
Geheime Feldpolizei (GFP) (Secret Field Police)
Reichssicherheitshauptamt (RSHA) (Reich Security Main Office)
Sicherheitsdienst (SD) (Security Service)
Feuerschutzpolizei (FSP) (Fire Protection Police)
Bahnschutzpolizei (BSP) (Railway Protection Police)
Luftschutzpolizei (LSP) (Air Raid Protection Police)
Schutzpolizei (Schupo) (State Police)
Gemeindepolizei (GemPo) (Local Police)
Schutzmannschaft (Schuma) (Auxiliary Police)

Fascist Italy
Milizia Volontaria (Volunteer Militia; Blackshirts)
Guardia Nazionale Repubblicana (National Republican Guard)
Organizzazione per la Vigilanza e la Repressione dell'Antifascismo (Organisation for Vigilance and Repression of Anti-Fascism)

Panama Canal Zone
Canal Zone Police

Second Polish Republic
Policja Państwowa (State Police)

People's Republic of Poland
Milicja Obywatelska (Citizens' Militia)
Zmotoryzowane Odwody Milicji Obywatelskiej (Motorized Reserves of the Citizens' Militia)
Ochotnicza Rezerwa Milicji Obywatelskiej (Volunteer Reserve Militia)
Wojskowa Służba Wewnętrzna (Internal Military Service)
Ministerstwo Bezpieczeństwa Publicznego (Ministry of Public Security)
Służba Bezpieczeństwa MSW (Security Service of the Ministry of Internal Affairs)

Philippines
 Philippine Constabulary
 Integrated National Police
 Philippine National Guard
 Civil Guard

Communist Romania
Securitate

Former Soviet Union/Russia
KGB (Committee for State Security)
Militsiya (Militia)
Federal Tax Police Service of the Russian Federation
Federal Migration Service
Federal Narcotics Control Service
Ministry of Police of the Russian Empire

South Vietnam 
Republic of Vietnam National Police

See also
Anti-corruption agency
Auxiliary police
Law enforcement by country
List of intelligence agencies
List of protective service agencies
List of national border guard agencies
List of gendarmeries
List of historical secret police organizations
List of special police units
Vigilante

References

 
Law enforcement agencies